Mohamed Ibrahim Saleh (1917 – 2 September 1981) was an Egyptian weightlifter. He competed at the 1948 Summer Olympics and the 1952 Summer Olympics.

References

1917 births
1981 deaths
Egyptian male weightlifters
Olympic weightlifters of Egypt
Weightlifters at the 1948 Summer Olympics
Weightlifters at the 1952 Summer Olympics
Place of birth missing
World Weightlifting Championships medalists
20th-century Egyptian people